The 2000–01 Kategoria e Dytë was the 54th season of a second-tier association football league in Albania.

North group

Centre group

South group

Championship/promotion playoff 
 Played at neutral venues in Tiranë, Elbasan, Durrës and Kuçovë.

References

 Calcio Mondiale Web
 RSSSF.org

Kategoria e Parë seasons
2
Alba